Peter Cox Jr. (born January 18, 1967) is an American fencer. He competed in the individual and team sabre events at the 1996 Summer Olympics.

References

External links
 

1967 births
Living people
American male sabre fencers
Olympic fencers of the United States
Fencers at the 1996 Summer Olympics
People from Bronxville, New York
Sportspeople from New York (state)